"Freek'n You" is a song by American R&B group Jodeci recorded for their third album, The Show, the After Party, the Hotel (1995). The song, released as the album's first single, peaked at number 14 on the Billboard Hot 100 in 1995. Listed by Billboard magazine as one of the best selling singles of 1995, it was certified gold by the RIAA for sales in excess of 600,000 units.

The official remix, produced by Mr. Dalvin, features Raekwon and Ghostface Killah. They performed the remix version live with Jodeci (minus DeVante Swing) during the 200th episode of Showtime at the Apollo in February 1996. It features three models in the video: Veronica Webb, Beverly Peele, and Kara Young.

Critical reception
Steve Baltin from Cash Box wrote, "A slow and grinding tune, the first single from Jodeci’s forthcoming The Show, The After-Party, The Hotel is a guaranteed hit, given the group's past success (lead singer K-Ci Hailey currently has a song on the charts) and the song’s play it safe attitude."

Track listings
 Vinyl, 12"
"Freek'n You" (Part 1) - 5:16
"Freek'n You" (Funky Freeky Mix) - 4:19
"Freek'n You" (Radio Edit) - 4:19
"Freek'n You" (P.J.B. 4 Play) - 1:23
"Freek'n You" (Freekstrumental Mix) - 4:01
"Freek'n You" (Freek-A-Pella Mix) - 5:09

 CD, maxi-single
"Freek'n You" (Part 1) - 5:16
"Freek'n You" (Funky Freeky Mix) - 4:19
"Freek'n You" (Radio Edit) - 4:19
"Freek'n You" (P.J.B. 4 Play) - 1:23
"Freek'n You" (Freekoustical Mix) - 5:17
"Freek'n You" (Freekstrumental Mix) - 4:01
"Freek'n You" (Freek-A-Pella Mix) - 5:09

Personnel
Information taken from the album's liner notes.
Cedric "K-Ci" Hailey - lead and background vocals
Joel "JoJo" Hailey - lead and background vocals
Mr. Dalvin - lead and background vocals
DeVante Swing - background vocals, guitar, other instruments
Darryl Pearson - additional guitar
DeVante Swing (a.k.a. DeVanté 4HISDAMNSELF ENT.) - production & all vocal arrangements
Andre Harrell - executive producer

Charts and certifications

Weekly charts

Year-end charts

Certifications

Covers and sampling
The song was remixed by UK garage act Club Asylum in 1998, titled "Freek Me Up". It reached No. 92 on the UK Singles Chart.
The song was sampled in 2015 by British duo Tough Love on their debut single "So Freakin' Tight" as well as Future and Mila J's song "FreakNic".
In 2017, PARTYNEXTDOOR released his EP Colours 2, featuring "Freak in You" which interpolates the song, as well as "Come and Talk to Me" from Jodeci. Drake would go on to remix PARTYNEXTDOOR's "Freak in You" as well.
In 2019, the song was sampled by DJ Khaled in "Freak N You" featuring Lil Wayne and Gunna.
Covers of the song have been performed live by R&B singers including Trey Songz, Ne-Yo and Anthony Hamilton.

Media appearances
The Notorious B.I.G. can be seen singing the beginning of the first verse in a video clip from 1996. The clip is shown in the beginning of the video for "Nasty Girl", a posthumous single released in 2005 from the album Duets: The Final Chapter.
The song was featured in the 2008 video game Grand Theft Auto IV, appearing on the R&B radio station The Vibe 98.8.
The song is also featured on the official soundtrack for the 2015 film Magic Mike XXL.
In a 2015 episode of Black-ish, the song was played
In 2018, the song is used as the first ending theme song for the Golden Wind arc of the JoJo's Bizarre Adventure anime series.

References

External links

1995 singles
Jodeci songs
Music videos directed by Brett Ratner
Song recordings produced by DeVante Swing
Songs written by DeVante Swing
1994 songs
JoJo's Bizarre Adventure songs